Bulrush is a vernacular name for several large wetland grass-like plants
Sedge family (Cyperaceae): 
Cyperus
Scirpus
Blysmus
Bolboschoenus
Scirpoides
Isolepis
Schoenoplectus
Trichophorum
Typhaceae:
Typha

The Botanical Society of Britain and Ireland recommends "bulrush" as an English name for plants in the genus Typha. These species are also sometimes known as reedmace, cattails or black paddies.

One particular famous story involving bulrushes is that of the ark of bulrushes in the Book of Exodus. In this story, it is said that the infant Moses was found in a boat made of bulrushes. Within the context of the story, this is probably paper reed (Cyperus papyrus).

See also
Rushes (Juncaceae)

References